X is the third studio album by American R&B duo and brothers K-Ci & JoJo, released December 5, 2000 on MCA. Recording sessions took place during 1999–2000. Production was handled by various producers, including Mike Smoov, Rory Bennett, and DeVante Swing. The album peaked at number twenty on the US Billboard 200. It achieved acceptable international charting and produced two singles that had minor success charting. The lead single "Crazy" would peak at number 11 on the US Billboard Hot 100. Upon its release, X received average reviews from music critics. The album has been certified platinum by the Recording Industry Association of America (RIAA), for shipments of 1,000,000 copies in the United States.

Critical response 

X has received average reviews from music critics.

Track listing

Personnel 
Credits for X adapted from liner notes.

Charts

Weekly charts

Year-end charts

Certifications

References 

2000 albums
K-Ci & JoJo albums